Amer Al-Barkawi (born June 20, 1997), better known as Miracle-, is a Jordanian and Polish professional Dota 2 player for Nigma Galaxy. He was a member of Team Liquid that won The International 2017.

History 
Miracle-'s history with the multiplayer online battle arena genre began with Defense of the Ancients in the mid-2000s.
Miracle- started playing Dota 2 as a "pubstar", meaning he did not play competitively, but was ranked highly in public matches. Miracle-'s first entry into the professional scene was with the Balkan Bears in early 2015, although he did not participate in any major tournament and left the team after only four months.

Later that year, Miracle- reached an in-game matchmaking rating (MMR) of over 8000; thus surpassing Aliwi "w33" Omar and becoming the highest ranked player. Miracle- was picked up by team (monkey) Business. Following a sponsorship deal, (monkey) Business reformed themselves as OG. Shortly following the rebranding, Miracle- and the team won the Frankfurt Major. Following a 7–8th-place finish in the Shanghai Major, Miracle- and OG won the Manila Major and ESL One Frankfurt 2016.

In March 2016, Miracle- became the first Dota 2 player to reach 9000 MMR. After placing 9–12th at The International 2016, Miracle- left OG as a free agent to join Team Liquid in September 2016. He, along with the rest of the team, won The International 2017, which had the largest prize pool of any eesportstournament, winning nearly 11 million in prize money. In November 2019, he and the rest of Team Liquid left to form their own organization, Nigma.

References

Notes 

1997 births
Living people
Jordanian esports players
Dota players
Team Liquid players
OG (esports) players
Polish esports players
Place of birth missing (living people)
Naturalized citizens of Poland
Jordanian emigrants
Immigrants to Poland